A Beautiful Lie is the second studio album by American rock band Thirty Seconds to Mars, released on August 30, 2005 through Virgin Records. It was produced by Josh Abraham.

A Beautiful Lie differs notably from the band's self-titled debut album, both musically and lyrically. Whereas the eponymous concept album's lyrics focus on human struggle and astronomical themes, A Beautiful Lies lyrics are "personal and less cerebral". It is the first to feature guitarist Tomo Miličević and the only one to feature bassist Matt Wachter, who left the band in 2007. The album produced four singles, "Attack", "The Kill", "From Yesterday", and "A Beautiful Lie"; of which three of those four singles managed to chart within the top 30 on the US Modern Rock chart, with "The Kill" and "From Yesterday" entering the top three.

A Beautiful Lie received positive reviews from music critics, many praising the album for diverging from the sound of the band's previous work. The success of the album had helped the band receive accolades for their singles such as "The Kill" and "From Yesterday".

History 
A Beautiful Lie was recorded on four different continents in five different countries over a three-year period to accommodate lead singer Jared Leto's acting career. The album's title track, as well as three other songs, were composed in Cape Town, South Africa, where Leto was later met by his bandmates to work on the tracks. It was during this time that Leto conceived the album's title. Prior to this, the album was tentatively to be released under the title Battle of One. It was leaked onto peer-to-peer file sharing networks almost five months before its scheduled release; the version of the album that leaked was unmastered. Because of this, the band was forced to set back the album's release date.

To promote A Beautiful Lie, Thirty Seconds to Mars included the songs "Battle of One" and "Hunter" (originally performed by Björk) as bonus tracks. "Golden passes" were also included with three of the special versions of the album that entitled the buyer free entrance and backstage access to any Thirty Seconds to Mars show for the rest of their formation.

The original 2005 release of the album included the hidden track "Praying for a Riot" inside the song "A Modern Myth". Later releases of the album dropped the song.

A Beautiful Lie sold 21,000 copies in its first week of release in the US and has gone on to sell more than 1.2 million copies in the US alone.

Alternative versions

Deluxe edition 
On November 26, 2006 a special edition of A Beautiful Lie was released and features different artwork, a third bonus track (all versions have at least two); the UK version of the song "The Kill" entitled "The Kill (Rebirth)", and a DVD that features the music video for "The Kill", the making of the video for "The Kill", live performances and MTV2 moments involving the band.

Before production of the Deluxe Edition, the band requested that the members of the "Echelon" send in their names so that they could be thanked for their support over the years. As a result, the inside cover(s) of the Deluxe Edition contain a large list of printed fan names. In addition to this, the front cover contains a lenticular image consisting of the Mithra (phoenix) and the Trinity (skulls).

2007 re-release 
A Beautiful Lie was re-released on November 26, 2007, following extensive touring throughout Europe, in an attempt to expose themselves to a larger audience. The re-release is essentially the same as the original release, although includes different artwork. The album was re-released in Ireland again in November 2007, the version contains the UK version of "The Kill" and a second bonus track, and an acoustic version of the song "A Beautiful Lie" recorded live on a radio session.

Critical reception

A Beautiful Lie received generally positive reviews from music critics. Jon Wiederhorn from Revolver noted that "intensity and passion clearly inform the textural hard rock of A Beautiful Lie," which "boasts echoing riffs, moody bass lines, and strong vocal melodies that evoke a radio-friendly mix of Staind, Nine Inch Nails, U2, and The Cure." Jaan Uhelszki of the San Francisco Chronicle described the album as "full of ferocious electronics, overcaffeinated guitar lines and anxious drumming paired with brainy, brittle but emotionally austere lyrics." Nylon magazine called it "an album that is digestible without losing the rough-around-the-edges appeal that the band's rapidly expanding fan base crave." Alternative Addiction commented that the band recorded "an album with a handful of very impressive tracks," beginning with "Attack", the first song on the record, which "soars sonically with processing mixed and forceful vocals."

Christa L. Titus from Billboard felt that the band "proved its potency" with songs like "The Kill", "Was It a Dream?", and "From Yesterday", and praised Leto's vocal ability by writing, "[he] alternates between cathartic shouts and a tantalizing croon that shows his capable vocal range." Kaj Roth from Melodic praised the sonic variety and summarized the record as "an impressive list of anthemic rock songs." Davey Boy of Sputnikmusic echoed this sentiment, writing that A Beautiful Lie "works well as an album due to greater variety". He also found the record "a more controlled effort" than the band's debut album 30 Seconds to Mars (2002). Kerrang! magazine called it a "great album to close your eyes and fall in to, an anthemic eruption of upfront emotion."

In a mixed review, Stephen Thomas Erlewine from AllMusic wrote that the "band floats out of time, inspired heavily by '90s alt rock but too clean, heavy, and facile to truly be part of that tradition, yet too indebted to the past to sound like part of the 2000s, either." He found the band "capable enough at shifting from tense quiet verses to piledriving, heavy choruses, but they borrow the worst habits from all their favorite groups, and then assemble them in insufferably earnest fashion, playing clichés as if they were revelations." Christian Hoard of Rolling Stone stated, "[d]espite some credible modern-rock tunes, Leto's self-involved myopia guarantees that his band's second disc is long on melodrama."

Accolades
At the Billboard Music Awards, "The Kill" and "From Yesterday" were nominated in the category of Modern Rock Single of the Year in 2006 and 2007, respectively. In 2007, A Beautiful Lie was named Best Album by Rock on Request. Thirty Seconds to Mars received the Kerrang! Award for Best Single in two consecutive years for "The Kill" and "From Yesterday" in 2007 and 2008. Metal Edge ranked A Beautiful Lie one of the top 10 albums of 2005. Melodic included it among the best albums of the year. Alternative Addiction ranked it at number six on their list of 20 best albums of the year. In 2009, Kerrang! listed A Beautiful Lie at number four on their list of the 50 best albums of the decade. The album was included in Rock Sounds 101 Modern Classics list at number 78.

Track listing

Credits and personnel
Credits adapted from A Beautiful Lie album liner notes.

Thirty Seconds to Mars
 Jared Leto – vocals, rhythm guitar
 Shannon Leto – drums, percussion
 Tomo Miličević – lead guitar, keyboards, synthesizer, programming
 Matt Wachter – bass guitar, keyboards, synthesizer

Additional musicians
 Miguel Atwood-Ferguson – viola on track 10
 Caroline Campbell – violin on track 10
 Steve Dress – strings contractor and double bass on track 10
 Vanessa Freebairn-Smith – cello on track 10
 Oliver Goldstein – additional synthesizer on tracks 1, 6–7
 Neel Hammond – violin on track 10
 Wataru Hokoyama – string arranger on track 10
 Jeremy Rubolino – programming on track 12
 Matt Serletic – piano on track 3

Production
 Josh Abraham – production on tracks 1–10
 Thirty Seconds to Mars – production; creative direction and design
 Brian Virtue – production on tracks 3, 11–12; additional engineering; mixing and engineering on tracks 11–12
 Ryan Williams – engineering; mixing
 Brandon Belsky – assistant engineer
 Tom Lord-Alge – mixing on track 1
 Femio Hernandez – mixing assistant
 Dave Riley – assistant engineer
 Sean Geyer – assistant engineer
 Brian Gardner – mastering
 Sean Mosher-Smith – creative direction and design
 Olaf Heine – photography
 Gary Stiffelman – legal
 Irving Azoff – management
 Dian Vaughn – business management

Charts

Weekly charts

Year-end charts

Certifications

Release history

References

External links
 

2005 albums
Thirty Seconds to Mars albums
Albums produced by Josh Abraham
Immortal Records albums
Virgin Records albums